University Heights Historic District is located in Madison, Wisconsin. It was added to the National Register of Historic Places in 1982.

History
The land the district sits on was once owned by former Madison Mayor Breese J. Stevens. In 1893, Stevens sold the land to the University Heights Company for $53,000. Buildings in the district began being constructed the following year. The Harold C. Bradley House and the Eugene A. Gilmore House are located inside the district.

References

External links

Geography of Madison, Wisconsin
Historic districts on the National Register of Historic Places in Wisconsin
National Register of Historic Places in Madison, Wisconsin